Summer Louise Lochowicz (born 30 March 1978 in Townsville, Queensland) is an Australian beach volleyball player and team partner of Kerri Pottharst in her Olympic debut at the 2004 Summer Olympics in Athens.

Athens 2004 participation

Participation in other events 
 2004 World Cup (Mallorca): 3rd
 2004 World Cup (Berlin): 17th
 2004 World (Gstaad): 5th
 2004 World Cup (Osaka): 5th
 2003 Indonesia Open (IND): 5th
 2003 Stavanger Open (NOR): 5th
 2003 Milan Open (ITA): 17th
 2003 Gstaad Open (SUI): 17th
 2003 Rhodes Open (GRE): 25th
 2002 Mallorca Open (ESP): 9th
 2002 Klagenfurt Grand Slam (AUT): 9th
 2002 Marseille Grand Slam (FRA): 17th

External links 
 
 
 
 
 

1978 births
Living people
Australian women's beach volleyball players
Olympic beach volleyball players of Australia
Beach volleyball players at the 2004 Summer Olympics
Sportspeople from Townsville